FK GSP Polet Dorćol is a football club based in Dorćol, Belgrade, Serbia. They compete in the Belgrade Zone League, the fourth tier of the national league system.

History
The club was formed in 2017 following a merger between local rivals FK GSP Polet (founded in 1929) and FK Dorćol (founded in 1952) due to financial difficulties. They spent four seasons in the Serbian League Belgrade, before suffering relegation to the Belgrade Zone League in 2021.

Seasons

Managerial history

References

External links
 
 Club page at Srbijasport

2017 establishments in Serbia
Association football clubs established in 2017
Football clubs in Serbia
Football clubs in Belgrade
Stari Grad, Belgrade